Pale Saints is an American-Canadian crime film, directed by Joel Wyner and released in 1997. The film stars Sean Patrick Flanery as Louis and Michael Riley as Dody, small-time thugs trying to gain acceptance with an organized crime group by driving to Toronto for a crime job that goes catastrophically wrong.

The film's cast also includes Saul Rubinek, Rachael Crawford, Maury Chaykin, Gordon Pinsent, Jason Blicker, Julian Richings, Hardee T. Lineham and Patrick Gallagher.

The film received five Genie Award nominations at the 19th Genie Awards, for Best Director (Wyner), Best Supporting Actor (2: Riley, Rubinek), Best Supporting Actress (Crawford) and Best Costume Design (Tamara Winston).

References

External links

1997 films
American crime drama films
English-language Canadian films
Canadian crime drama films
Films shot in Toronto
Films set in Toronto
1990s English-language films
1990s American films
1990s Canadian films